The Hayoth are a fictional team of super powered Israeli super commandos published by DC Comics. They first appeared in Suicide Squad #45 (September 1990), and were created by John Ostrander, Kim Yale and Geof Isherwood. The Hayoth's team name is a reference to four holy beasts from the Zohar, as seen in the Soncino Zohar (1934) published as a part of the Soncino Books of the Bible series.

Publication history

Kobra
The Hayoth are a team of four super powered covert operatives who act as a special division of the Mossad. Their first contact with the West came when Amanda Waller was contracted to capture Kobra. Waller was informed of the Hayoth's existence by an Egyptian operative named Nazair. Nazair claimed that even though Kobra was in Israel, he was a threat to Egypt's interests as well.

Amanda Waller and the Suicide Squad covertly sneak into Jerusalem seeking to capture or kill Kobra. But the Squad's arrival is detected by the Hayoth, and their Mossad liaison Colonel Hacohen takes Waller and Vixen into custody in order to show them that the Hayoth has already captured Kobra. Amanda figures out that Kobra allowed the Hayoth to capture him but is unsure of why. Judith follows Vixen to a meeting with the Bronze Tiger and Ravan, she critically wounds Vixen and is nearly killed by the Bronze Tiger.

Meanwhile, the Atom discovers Kobra's true plan all along was to corrupt Dybbuk, the Hayoth's AI team member. Kobra "corrupted" Dybbuk through a series of philosophical conversations about the nature of good and evil, he then attempts to use Dybbuk to start World War III. The day is saved by Ramban the team's kabbalistic magician who has a lengthy conversation with Dybbuk about the true nature of good and evil, choice and morality.

Ray Palmer
Their next encounter occurred when the Hayoth mistakenly believed they would be allowed to take Qurac's former President Marlo into custody. This misunderstanding caused the Hayoth to become embroiled in a four way conflict with the Justice League (Superman, Batman and Aquaman) who were there searching for Ray Palmer (the Atom) as well as the Suicide Squad, and the Onslaught.

After a series of skirmishes Superman ends the fight with a shockwave caused by clapping both his hands together. The League confront Ray Palmer and he tells them about Micro Force and their murder of Adam Cray, the man who had been impersonating him as a member of the Suicide Squad.

Dybbuk and Ifrit
In order to gain the Hayoth's freedom after acting illegally on US soil, the entity known as Dybbuk agreed to help Amanda Waller and Doctor Simon LaGrieve of the IMHS (Institute for Metahuman Studies) deprogram Mindboggler. Mindboggler was now the entity known as "Ifrit" by entering the magnetic bottle that contained her new consciousness. Mindboggler's mind had been used by Quraci technicians as the template for Ifrit. Dybbuk succeeded, and Mindboggler who now recalled her original identity of Leah Wasserman, and Dybbuk now calling himself Lenny are engaged to be married.

Doomsday Clock
In the "Watchmen" sequel "Doomsday Clock", the Hayoth is mentioned to have been assembled as Israel's superhero team in light of "The Superman Theory". In addition to Seraph, Dybbuk, Golem, Judith, and Ramban, it was also mentioned that Pteradon is also a member of the Hayoth.

Membership
 Dybbuk - A stable artificial intelligence, who functions as the team's strategist and provides electronic countermeasures. Based on the same magnetic bottle technology used to create Djinn, Digital Djinn, and Ifrit (Leah Wasserman) of the Onslaught. In European Jewish folklore, a Dybbuk is a malicious possessing spirit, believed to be the dislocated soul of a dead person. 
 Golem - Moyshe Nakhman can shift his claylike body's composition between various solid and liquid forms. In Jewish folklore, a Golem is an animated being created entirely from inanimate matter.
 Colonel Hacohen - The division's commanding officer and Mossad liaison.
 Judith - An expert in fencing and shuriken-jutsu, trained in the martial arts and infiltration, calls herself the "Sword of Zion". Her main weapon appears to be a Mughal Talwar. The name Judith is Hebrew for "Praised".
 Ramban - Team leader, a magician named after the great Kabbalist, philosopher, and physician Nahmanides (Rabbi Moshe ben Nahman). Ramban has the Hebrew symbol for Aleph on his chest.

See also
Seraph

References

External links
Cosmic Teams: Hayoth
DCU Guide: Ramban
Adherents.com: Ramban
Adherents.com: The Hayoth

Fictional Israeli Jews
Fictional intelligence agencies
DC Comics superhero teams
Characters created by John Ostrander
Israeli superheroes